Michelle Davison (born October 22, 1979) is an American diver. She was born in Columbia, South Carolina. She competed at the 2000 Summer Olympics in Sydney, in the women's 3 metre springboard.

References

1979 births
Living people
People from Columbia, South Carolina
American female divers
Olympic divers of the United States
Divers at the 2000 Summer Olympics
Divers at the 2003 Pan American Games
Pan American Games competitors for the United States
21st-century American women